Siddikine or Seddiqine  is a small town in Southern Lebanon, located in Tyre District, Governorate of South Lebanon. It is situated 2km south of Qana beside the main road to Tebnine.

Origin of name
E. H. Palmer wrote that the name means "the truthful ones". The Arabic name is transliterated as Siddikine or Seddiqine.

History
In 1596, it was named as a village,  Sidiqin, in the Ottoman nahiya (subdistrict) of  Tibnin  under the liwa' (district) of Safad, with a population of  46  households, all Muslim. The villagers paid a  fixed tax rate of 25% on  agricultural products, such as wheat, barley, summer crops, fruit trees, goats and beehives, in addition to occasional revenues; a total of 10,752 akçe.

In 1875,  Victor Guérin noted: "Here are what appears to be the remains of an ancient synagogue. This kind of pillar generally terminates the end of the range of columns in these synagogues."

In 1881, the PEF's Survey of Western Palestine (SWP) described it: "A village, built of stone, with many ruined houses; contains about 150 Metawileh; surrounded by figs, gardens, and arable land. Water from cisterns and 'Ain el Tuzeh."

They further noted: "There are remains of an early Christian site at this village; some well-dressed stones scattered about with crosses on them: There are also rock-cut cisterns, tombs, and stone olive and wine presses. The site of the ancient place was a little to the north of the present village."

In May 1988, during the fighting between Amal and Hizbollah, the Amal militia attacked Hizbollah forces in Siddikine. After three days of fighting, in which fifty were killed, the Amal fighters succeeded in taking the village. At the time it had been Hizbollah’s last stronghold in Southern Lebanon.

On 19 May 2021, about two weeks after the beginning of the 2021 Israel–Palestine crisis, four rockets were reportedly launched from near Siddikine towards Israel. According to the Israel Defense Forces (IDF), its missile defences intercepted one of them, while the other projectiles fell in open areas. The IDF fired artillery in response, apparently towards the outskirts of Siddikine.

References

Bibliography

External links
 Saddiqine, Localiban
Survey of Western Palestine, Map 2:   IAA, Wikimedia commons

Populated places in the Israeli security zone 1985–2000
Populated places in Tyre District
Shia Muslim communities in Lebanon